Aashiqui Deewangi is a 2001 unreleased Bollywood film starring Karan Nath.

Songs
"Aashiqui Deewangi" – Sonu Nigam

References

2001 films
Films scored by Nadeem–Shravan
2000s Hindi-language films
Films directed by Vimal Kumar